The 2018 Homeless World Cup was the 16th edition of the Homeless World Cup which  took place in  Zocalo, Mexico city from November 13–18.

More than 500 players representing 47 countries traveled to Mexico City to attend the long-week festival of football, in what was promised to be one of the most spectacular Homeless World Cup tournaments . This was the second time Mexico hosted the tournament after the 2012 edition.

Official Mascots 
In the spirit of the 50th anniversary of the Mexico 1968 Summer Olympic Games, the Mexico 2018 Homeless World Cup presented 6 mascots. Each representing a different continent, these charming mascots are energetic to bring together players from all around the world as well as fans of all ages.

YAGU – A JAGUAR Native to Mexico and Latin America, the Jaguar has always featured in pre-Hispanic culture. Olmecs, Teotihuacán and Mayan cultures all regarded the Jaguar as a symbol of pride, power and might. The Aztecs regarded the jaguar as the bravest of beasts, and the proud ‘ruler of the animal world.’ It comes as no surprise then, that the jaguar would be representing the host nation at this year's Homeless World Cup.

LUGA – A LIZARD Fast and nimble, this little lizard is sure to bring some amazing game and sneak through the opposition. Representing the African nations, Luga is sure to be an absolute crowd-pleaser with some awesome tricks up his sleeve. During his free time, Luga can be found relaxing in the sun or challenging teams into a dance competition. Some people claim that he is so fast he can run on water!  

SASÍ – A BIRD

Representing the Americas, Sasí brings flexibility and adaptability to her game. Her abilities to learn and adapt make her a worthy, often unpredictable player. Her determination also makes her one of the most technical players, as she is always training to perfect her game. When she is not training or enjoying some nourishing grubs, Sasí can be found singing next to the pitch. She hopes she'll be able to fly through the competition. 

BON LI – A RABBIT

Bon Li enjoys the event at its fullest, and is determined to make friends with teams, volunteers and fans alike. But don't let her gentle manners off the pitch fool you, she is an agile and accomplished player, and is sure to hop rings around the opposition. Representing Asia, Bon Li is a blast of energy and can be found running around on site, taking small breaks only to re-fuel on her favorite snack, carrots.

LUPO – A WOLF

Representing Europe, Lupo is a natural team player who believes the entire team should call the shots but can easily become the leader of the pack if required. Speed and dexterity are both attributes of the wolf, but its real success lies in its social cooperation and its ability to make friends with members of other packs. Lupo has been spotted with his pack howling support for other teams.

JANS – A SHARK

Sharks are often misunderstood creatures and Jans is no exception. Representing Oceania, Jans’ most defining qualities are strength and determination, but this is not to say that he doesn't have a softer side. Even though this year's tournament sees no teams from Oceania, this gentle giant has travelled all the way to support the rest of the teams and can be found at the stands cheering for the players. Go and talk to him, we promise he won't bite!

Tournament Rules 

The winning team gets 3 points. The losing team gets zero points. If a match ends in a draw, it is decided by sudden-death penalty shootout and the winning team gets three points and the losing team gets one point.
Games are 14 minutes long, in two seven-minute halves.
The field is 22m (long) x 16m (wide).

Participating nations 
The Homeless World Cup organization operates through a network of more than 70 national partners around the world, supporting football programs and social enterprise development. There are total of 47 men's team and 16 women's are participating in the 2018 Homeless World Cup which are national partners of Homeless World Cup Foundation and are tasked to provide or provide access to education, employment, health or legal advice to its homeless people.

|}

Group stage

Group A

Group B

Group C

Group D

Group E

Group F

Group G

Group H

The Homeless World Cup Finals

Winner

References

External links
website
The Rules for the annual football tournament

Homeless World Cup
2018–19 in Mexican football
2018 in association football
Sports competitions in Mexico City
International association football competitions hosted by Mexico
Homeless World Cup
2010s in Mexico City